Arvin is a city in California.

Arvin may also refer to:

 Arvin Industries, Inc., merged with Meritor Automotive, Inc. in 2000

People with the given name Arvin
 Arvin Slagter (born 1985), Dutch basketball player
 Arvin Reingold (1930-2020), American lawyer and politician
 Arvin Russell, a character in film The Devil All the Time
 Arvin Sloane, a character in the television series Alias

People with the surname Arvin
 Newton Arvin (1900–1963), American literary critic, historian and academic
 Reed Arvin, American record producer, keyboardist and author

See also
 ARVN, the Army of the Republic of Vietnam
 Arvind, a similar Indian given name